This is a list of American films released in 1983.

In 1983:
 Terms of Endearment won the Academy Award for Best Picture.
 Return of the Jedi was the highest-grossing film of the year.



List of films

See also
 1983 in American television
 1983 in the United States

External links

 
 List of 1983 box office number-one films in the United States

Films
Lists of 1983 films by country or language
1983